Movses Gevorgi Gorgisyan (3 December 1961 – 19 January 1990) was an Armenian politician and national hero, one of the leaders of the Nagorno-Karabakh movement. He was one of the founders of the Army of Independence. Widely known for his speeches on the independence of Armenia, he was also an active advocate of Artsakh's independence campaign.

Biography
Movses Gorgisyan was born on December 3, 1961 in Yerevan, the capital of Armenia. In 1984, Gorgisyan graduated from the Armenian State Pedagogical University's Department of Culture, with the qualification of a stage director and producer. From 1986-1987, he worked at the Theatre of Goris. In 1987, he joined the national movement, becoming a member of the Union for National Self-Determination.

Gorgisyan led the demonstrations for independence in Yerevan which led to him being jailed in 1988. He also was an editor of the Armenian edition of Glasnost magazine. Gorgisyan was the first person to hoist Armenia's tricolor flag on 28 May 1988 for the first time. This was the same day the First Republic of Armenia was founded 70 years prior.

In late 1989, Gorgisyan and several other members of the Union for National Self-Determination founded the Army of Independence (Ankakhutʻyan banak), an armed group which engaged in violent clashes with the Soviet and Soviet Azerbaijani authorities in the Armenian SSR and the Nagorno-Karabakh Autonomous Oblast.

Death
Gorgisyan was killed on 19 January 1990 during a battle with Azerbaijani forces in Yeraskh near the border villages in Ararat region and was buried at Tsitsernakaberd memorial complex. He posthumously received the highest title in Armenia, the National Hero of Armenia award.

References

External links
Մ. Գորգիսեան - ՍՈՒԳԸ ՀԱՎԵՐԺ Է, ԵԹԵ ՊԱՅՔԱՐ ՉԿԱ
Biography, Mil.am

1961 births
1990 deaths
Armenian State Pedagogical University alumni
Armenian activists
Armenian nationalists
Armenian military personnel of the Nagorno-Karabakh War
National Hero of Armenia